Rubus gunnianus is a species in the genus Rubus of the family Rosaceae. It is a small herb that grows in subalpine and alpine habitats above 900m throughout Tasmania, and bears edible fruit. It is commonly known as the native strawberry or Tasmanian alpine raspberry.

Taxonomy 
The name Gunnianus comes from the botanist Ronald Campbell Gunn. Gunn worked closely with Ronald Lawrence; who knew British botanist Joseph Hooker. The authority of this species was named after Hooker. Gunn travelled around Tasmania, collecting specimens and sending them back for Hooker's book "Introduction to Flora Tasmaniae". Over 50 Tasmanian plant species gained Gunn's name, but a number of names would have since been changed over the years.

Description 
Rubus gunnianus is the smallest of all the species in the family Rosaceae. It grows as a small, prostrate herb in alpine habitats throughout Tasmania. When mature, the plant can spread by sending out runners to make the plant larger, as well as by setting seed. Unlike other species of the genus Rubus, this species does not have any thorns or spines. The leaves grow out from the stem as a florette, and are triangular and glossy green. The palmately compound leaves are composed of three pinnatipartite leaflets (one main one flanked by two smaller ones either side), with very long petioles.

Rubus gunnianus is bisexual (having both male and female organs on the same flower), and the flowers are small, white, with five petals. Members of the family Rosaceae are well known for producing edible fruit, which is suitable for bush tucker.

Distribution and habitat 
Rubus gunnianus is found in mountainous areas such as alpine moorlands, and subalpine woodlands across Tasmania, including areas such as the Central Coast, Derwent Valley, Hobart, Huon Valley and the West Coast. It is frost hardy, which is essential to alpine environments, due to the harsh weather and exposed conditions at high altitude. It prefers moist, sheltered areas among mosses and leaf litter, where it can survive the harsh conditions of alpine areas, but it can also survive in semi-exposed areas.

Uses 

The red, raspberry-looking fruit is edible; and is made up of a few drupes. A purple dye can be made from the fruit juice. Members of the genus Rubus are well known for their nutritional benefits of being high in vitamins and nutrients such as vitamin C, potassium, magnesium, iron and copper, while being low in sugar. This species is suitable for domestic cultivation, and R. gunnianus may be a good choice for people with limited space to grow plants, because it is quite small and would take up little room. It can also be grown in pots. R. gunnianus requires well drained moist soils, part shade to full sun, and is suitable in a variety of soil types in alpine and subalpine areas.

Conservation status 
Rubus gunnianus has not yet been assessed for the IUCN Red List, however, it is quite common in alpine habitats throughout Tasmania; therefore no conservation concern is required at present.

References

External links
 

gunnianus
Flora of Tasmania